This is a list of Texas suffragists, suffrage groups and others associated with the cause of women's suffrage in Texas.

Groups 

 American Woman Suffrage Association, petitions Texas Legislature to allow women's suffrage in 1872.
 Austin Friends of Female Suffrage.
 Austin Woman Suffrage Association.
Colored Welfare League of Austin.
 Dallas Equal Suffrage Association (DESA), started on March 15, 1913, in Dallas.
 Equal Franchise League of San Antonio.
 El Paso Equal Franchise League.
 El Paso Negro Woman's Civic and Enfranchisement League started in 1918.
 Galveston Equal Suffrage Association.
Galveston Negro Women's Voter League.
 Georgetown Equal Suffrage League, started in 1916.
 Houston Equal Suffrage Association.
 Houston Suffrage League.
 National Woman's Party, Texas chapter started in 1916.
 Negro Women's Voter League (Galveston), formed in 1917.
 Smith County Equal Franchise League (Tyler).
 Texas Equal Rights Association (TERA) formed in 1893.
 Texas Federation of Colored Women's Clubs endorses suffrage in 1917.
 Texas Woman Suffrage Association, which later becomes the Texas Equal Suffrage Association (TESA) in 1916.
 Waco Equal Franchise Society.
 Women's Christian Temperance Union (WCTU), Texas chapter, endorses women's suffrage in 1888.

Suffragists 

 Christia Adair.
 Sarah C. Acheson (Denison).
 Jessie Ames (Georgetown).
 Annie Webb Blanton (Houston, Denton).
 Eleanor Brackenridge (San Antonio).
 Hattie Brewer (Dallas).
 Belle Murray Burchill (Fort Worth).
 Belle Critchett (El Paso).
 Minnie Fisher Cunningham.
 Ellen Lawson Dabbs.
 Grace Danforth (Dallas).
 Alzina Orndorff DeGroff (El Paso).
Louise Dietrich (El Paso).
 Nell Gertrude Horne Doom (Austin).
 A. Caswell Ellis (Austin).
 Mary Heard Ellis (Austin).
 Marin B. Fenwick (San Antonio).
 Elizabeth Finnigan Fain (Houston).
 Annette Finnigan (Houston).
 Ermina Thompson Folsom (Austin).
 Elizabeth Austin Turner Fry (San Antonio).
 Eva Goldsmith (Houston).
 Rena Maverick Green.
 Rebecca Henry Hayes (Dallas).
 Sarah Grimke Wattles Hiatt (Eldorado, Texas).
 Elizabeth Hart Good Houston (Dallas).
 Margaret Bell Houston (Dallas).
 Jovita Idar.
 May Jarvis.
 Mary Kate Hunter (Palestine).
 Ellen Keller (Fort Worth).
 Helen Jarvis Kenyon.
 Edith Hinkle League (Galveston, San Antonio).
 Nona Boren Mahoney (Dallas).
 Alice McFadin McAnulty.
 Jane Y. McCalllum.
 Emma J. Mellette (Waco).
 Perle Potter Penfield Newell (Houston).
 Elisabet Ney.
 Anna Pennybacker (Austin, Tyler).
 Eliza E. Peterson (Texarkana).
 Elizabeth Herndon Potter (Tyler).
 Mary Withers Roper (Houston).
 Maude Sampson (El Paso).
 Jane Madden Spell (Waco).
 Florence M. Sterling (Houston).
 Helen M. Stoddard (Fort Worth).
 Sara Isadore Sutherland (Dallas).
 Martha Goodwin Tunstall.
 Anna Elizabeth Leger Walker (Austin).
 Hortense Sparks Ward (Houston).
 Lulu White (Houston).
 Clara M. Snell Wolfe (Austin).

Politicians supporting women's suffrage 

 Jess Alexander Baker.
 Paul Page (Bastrop).
 Charles Culberson.
 Ebenezer Lafayette Dohoney (Paris).
 Albert Jennings Fountain (El Paso).
 Claude Hudspeth (El Paso).
 Governor William P. Hobby.
 John Jones (Amarillo).
 Charles B. Metcalfe.
 Barry Miller (Dallas).
 Titus H. Mundine.
 Lucian Parrish (Henrietta).
 Morris Sheppard.
 Hatton Sumners (Dallas).

Suffragists who campaigned in Texas 

 Carrie Chapman Catt, lectured in Houston in 1903.
 Mariana Thompson Folsom, toured Texas in 1884.
 Prison Special, arrived in San Antonio in 1919.
 Anna Howard Shaw, suffrage tour in 1908 and in 1912.
 Ethel Snowden, spoke at the 1913 Texas Equal Suffrage Association convention. 
 Elizabeth Cady Stanton, in Houston in 1875.

Places 

 Adolphus Hotel, site of annual suffragist luncheon.
 Grand Windsor Hotel, site of the organization of first statewide suffrage group in Texas, 1893.
 Saint Anthony Hotel, site of major women's suffrage convention in 1913.
 Texas State Fair, site of women's suffrage activism.

Publications 

 Texas Democrat, suffrage newspaper edited by Dr. A. Caswell Ellis.

Anti-suffragists

Groups 

 Texas Association Opposed to Woman Suffrage (TAOWS) started in 1916.

Individuals 

 Joseph Weldon Bailey (Gainesville).
 Ida Darden.
 John Nance Garner.
 Governor James Ferguson.
 Pauline Wells (Brownsville, Texas).
 James B. Wells, Jr. (Brownsville).

See also 

 Timeline of women's suffrage in Texas
 Women's suffrage in Texas
Women's suffrage in states of the United States
 Women's suffrage in the United States

References

Sources 

 
 
 
 

 
 

Texas suffrage

Texas suffragists
Activists from Texas
History of Texas
suffragists